Juan Liu (born February 14, 1985) is an American table tennis player, who was born in and previously competed for China.  She is a competitor at  the 2020 Summer Olympics.

References

External links
 https://olympics.com/tokyo-2020/olympic-games/en/results/table-tennis/athlete-profile-n1317845-liu-juan.htm
 Team USA profile

1985 births
Living people
American female table tennis players
American sportspeople of Chinese descent
American sportswomen of Chinese descent
Olympic table tennis players of the United States
Table tennis players at the 2020 Summer Olympics
Sportspeople from Wuhan
Sportspeople from New York City
Chinese emigrants to the United States
21st-century American women